Haffer is a surname. Notable people with the surname include:

Fritz Haffer (1914–?), Romanian handball player
Jürgen Haffer (1932–2010), German ornithologist
Karl Haffer (1912–?), Romanian handball player
Virna Haffer (1899–1974), American photographer

See also
Chaffer